Wasserfluh Pass (el. 848 m.) is a mountain pass in the canton of St. Gallen in Switzerland.

It connects Lichtensteig and Brunnadern. The pass road has a maximum grade of 10 percent and an elevation gain of 345 m.

Overlooking the pass are the ruins of Neu-Toggenburg castle, built by the counts of Toggenburg in the late 12th century (excavated 1937/8).

References

Mountain passes of Switzerland
Mountain passes of the canton of St. Gallen